The women's sprint competition at the 2022 UEC European Track Championships was held on 14 and 15 August 2022.

Results

Qualifying
The top 14 riders qualified for the 1/8 finals, 15th to 18th places qualified for the 1/16 finals.

1/16 finals
Heat winners advanced to the 1/8 finals.

1/8 finals
Heat winners advanced to the quarterfinals.

Quarterfinals
Matches are extended to a best-of-three format hereon; winners proceed to the semifinals.

Semifinals
Winners proceed to the gold medal final; losers proceed to the bronze medal final.

Finals

References

Women's sprint
European Track Championships – Women's sprint